The Silver Sisterhood was a new religious movement that was active in Burtonport, County Donegal, Ireland from 1982 to 1992. The group has also been referred to as the Rhennish Community and St. Bride's. English writer Miss Martindale was a prominent member. The community is known for creating early text adventure video games such as The Snow Queen and Jack the Ripper.

Rhennish community
The Silver Sisterhood came to Burtonport from Yorkshire in September 1982 and occupied a large house that had previously been the home of the Atlantis commune (often referred to as the Screamers). They christened the house An Droichead Beo, meaning The Bridge of Life. There were seven members initially.

The Sisterhood believed in a feminine Supreme Deity. They worshipped God as the Mother and claimed that everything they did centred around the worship of Her. Music and chanting had great importance as acts of devotion. The musical instruments used by the group were all handmade by them. They stressed a great emphasis on craft as a path to the sacred. There was also an emphasis on self-sufficiency and the members grew food to feed themselves and sell. Members fasted on Fridays by skipping breakfast and lunch. They operated a tearoom in the house which served the town. No electricity or modern appliances were used by the group initially and plastic was shunned as a pollutant. Female members wore full-length dresses, covered their heads in public and referred to themselves as 'maids'.

The Rhennish community was matriarchal. The group claimed to be following a matriarchal structure that was the norm in western Europe in ancient times. Patriarchy was described as a recent and unusual development that would soon die out and be replaced by a matriarchal golden age. Men could become members. One man was part of the original group that came to Burtonport in 1982. However, he had left by July 1983. In an interview for RTÉ a member expressed hope that men would come to live in the community long-term but acknowledged that it was difficult to attract them. The community was also hierarchical in nature. Equality was claimed to be a patriarchal concept that stopped people from working together. In an interview for WomanSpirit magazine, the view was expressed by one member that there are always leaders in a group whether acknowledged or not and that "some maids like to tell others what to do and some maids like to be told what to do".

St. Bride's
Later in the 1980s members began to wear full Victorian era outfits on a regular basis and to style themselves as Romantics. In 1984 the house was re-christened as St. Bride's, after the 5th century Irish abbess and miracle worker (see: Brigid of Kildare). Visitors to St. Bride's were offered various courses including peat cutting and the experience of attending a Victorian boarding school. The school was advertised in various publications including the Observer, the Sunday Times, Girl About Town and the theatre programme of the play Daisy Pulls It Off. Daily Telegraph writer Candida Crewe likened the house to a Gothic novel where "a single candle flickered behind a lace curtain, guests were invited into a parlour heated only by a feeble coal fire, and the mistress of the house greeted her guests wearing a long black dress and white lace collar". The prospectus offered courses in mathematics, elementary Latin, grammar and literature. Traditional school artefacts such as desks, slates, uniforms, and canes were included in the setting. Despite claims in the press, physical discipline was not part of the school experience for guests. Two women, including Miss Martindale, ran the group in this phase.

In line with their espoused Victorian values, anti-modern and elitist views were expressed by St. Bride's in the Victorian phase. Miss Martindale stated that "some people are meant to rule and others to serve". The group was involved in the anti-metric system campaign "Don't Give an Inch". In a 1988 appearance on The Late Late Show the two leaders of St. Bride's said that they adopted Victorian dress because they liked it and it was their way of being creative.

To raise money St. Bride's also sold handmade costumes and jewellery, and published books and magazines. One business venture they are well known for is creating eight text adventure video games. Although television was shunned, computer games were liked as they involved "concentration and commitment". The Secret of St. Bride's, a time travel adventure set in the school itself, was the first game they created, followed by The Snow Queen based on the Hans Christian Andersen fairy tale, The Very Big Cave Adventure, a parody of Colossal Cave Adventure that also includes sequences parodying Alice in Wonderland and Batman, Bugsy, set in Prohibition Chicago and starring a gangster rabbit, and Jack the Ripper, set in 1888 London and a mystical otherland. A departure from St. Bride's earlier light-hearted adventures, Jack the Ripper was the first video game to receive an "18" rating, mainly on the basis of illustrations supplied by CRL. The examiner described the script as "more fairy tale than macabre horror".  The final three games were more traditional fantasies and were released in 1991 by GI Games.

The group left Burtonport in 1992, relocating to Oxford and then to London. Far-right and antisemitic publications were found in the house after they left. This included a two-year correspondence with John Tyndall, then leader of the British National Party, who expressed his admiration for what the St. Bride's group were doing. One former member denied in an interview with The Daily Telegraph that they had far-right leanings.

Members of the community used numerous different pseudonyms throughout their time in Burtonport and afterwards, which created confusion among those writing about the group.

Video game releases 
 The Secret of St. Bride's – 1985
 The Snow Queen – 1985
 The Very Big Cave Adventure – 1986
 Bugsy – 1986
 Jack the Ripper – 1987
 The White Feather Cloak – 1991
 The Dogboy – 1991
 Silverwolf – 1991
 2011 aka Wondergirl – never released

See also
Atlantis (commune) – A different new religious movement that occupied the same premises as the Silver Sisterhood before them

References

External links
 1, 2, 3, 4 RTÉ archive footage about the Silver Sisterhood.

BBC Radio Ulster - Assume Nothing - The Secrets of St Brides. 

1982 establishments in Ireland
1992 disestablishments in Ireland
Intentional communities in Ireland
Matriarchy
New religious movements
Religion in County Donegal
Video gaming in Ireland
Women's organisations based in Ireland